Padstow is an electoral division of Cornwall in the United Kingdom. The current Councillor is Stephen Rushworth, a Conservative.

Councillors

2009-2021

2021-present

Extent

2009-2021
The former division represented the town of Padstow, the villages of Trevone, St Merryn, Constantine Bay, and the hamlets of Crugmeer, Treator and Treyarnon as well as parts of Porthcothan (which was shared with the St Issey and St Tudy division). The division was affected by boundary changes at the 2013 election. From 2009 to 2013, the division covered 2955 hectares; from 2013 to its abolition in 2021, the division covered 2960 hectares.

2021-present
The current division represents the town of Padstow, the villages of Trevone, Harlyn, Constantine Bay, St Merryn, Porthcothan, St Issey and Little Petherick, and the hamlets of Crugmeer, Treator, Towan, Treyarnon, Engollan, Penrose, St Eval, St Ervan, Rumford, St Jidgey, Trevance, Tregonce, Trevorrick and Highlanes.

Election results

2021-present

2021 election

2009-2021

2017 election

2013 election

2009 election

Notes

References

Electoral divisions of Cornwall Council
Padstow